The Russian Open was a golf tournament on the European Tour. The event was established in 1993, and was first held at the Moscow Country Club in Nakhabino, just outside Krasnogorsk, Moscow Oblast, Russia.

History
Originally contested over the first nine holes at the Moscow Country Club as an amateur tournament while the rest of the course was still under construction, the Russian Open became Russia's first professional golf tournament in 1994. It became an event on the second-tier Challenge Tour in 1996, and was added to the European Tour schedule from 2003. Between 2003 and 2005, it was an official money event on both tours, and from 2006 to 2008, it was solely an event on the European Tour calendar.

The 2005 prize fund of $500,000 was around a tenth of those of the leading events on the European Tour, even leaving aside the major championships and World Golf Championships. However, it was one of the richest tournaments of the season on the Challenge Tour. In 2006, when it became a European Tour only event, the prize fund doubled to $1 million, doubling again the following year, to $2 million.

The tournament was not played from 2009 to 2012 but returned in 2013 at the Tseleevo Golf & Polo Club. Tseleevo had hosted a Challenge Tour event, the M2M Russian Challenge Cup, from 2010 to 2012. The Russian Open moved to the Skolkovo Golf Club in 2015 where Andrey Pavlov made history when he became the first Russian to make the cut in a European Tour event. He finished 71st, last of those who made the cut.

Winners

Notes

Notes

External links
Russian Open Golf Championship – official site
Coverage on the European Tour's official site

Former European Tour events
Former Challenge Tour events
Golf tournaments in Russia
Sports competitions in Moscow
Recurring sporting events established in 1993
Recurring sporting events disestablished in 2015
1993 establishments in Russia
2015 disestablishments in Russia
Defunct sports competitions in Russia